Sju sorters kakor (Norwegian: syv slags kaker), "seven kinds of cookies", is a Swedish and Norwegian tradition where hosts typically prepare seven different kinds of cookies for their guests. While the specific type of cookie varies from household to household, the number of types is consistently seven, as less than seven would indicate an insufficient host, while over seven would indicate a pretentious host. While the tradition started in Sweden, it has since spread to Norwegian and Scandinavian-American households.

History 

In 1823, Sweden lifted its ban on coffee consumption, leading to more coffee being drunk around the country. This led to an increase in 'kaffehuses' – small cafes that would typically serve coffee and småkakor (little cookies). As cafes became more popular and fika became more common, competition for the highest quality cookies became rampant, and hosts were pressured to create varieties of different cookies for guests to enjoy.

In 1945, following the lifting of rationing caused by World War II, cookies and their ingredients were easier to come by, and much cheaper to make. The cookbook Swedish Cakes and Cookies (Swedish title: Sju sorters kakor) by Märta Holmgren was published, selling over 3.8 million copies and being Sweden's best-selling cookbook to date. This spread the tradition further and increased its popularity through the 20th century.

Types of cookies

References

Further reading 
   English translation of a cookbook named after this tradition.

Christmas in Sweden
Christmas food
Swedish cuisine
Swedish culture
Norwegian culture